Statue of Charles Devens may refer to

 Equestrian statue of Charles Devens
 Statue of Charles Devens (Boston)